Allan A. Hackner (born July 18, 1954), nicknamed "the Iceman", is a retired Canadian Hall of Fame curler from Thunder Bay, Ontario. He was born in Nipigon, Ontario. He is a two-time Brier and World Champion skip.  He is of Ojibwa descent and is a member of the Red Rock Indian Band. He is currently a member of USA Curling's High Performance Program Coaching staff.

Career
Hackner has skipped the Northern Ontario team at nine Briers. He won the Brier in 1982 and again in 1985.

In 1982, he defeated Brent Giles of British Columbia to win his first Brier.

In 1985, he defeated Pat Ryan of Alberta to win his second Brier. To tie the game with last rock in the 10th end Hackner had to make a near impossible double-take out, coming around a guard to hit two stones some 6 feet apart, which would later go down in curling infamy as the "Al Hackner double". Hackner's team then stole a single point in the extra end for the win. The shot was named the greatest moment in Northern Ontario curling history by the Northern Ontario Curling Association.

In addition to playing for Northern Ontario, Hackner also represented Alberta at the 1977 Canadian Mixed Curling Championship, playing second for Don Sutton.

In 2004, Al Hackner was inducted into the Ontario Sports Hall of Fame.

Hackner won the 2006 Canadian Senior Curling Championships which he followed up with a silver medal at the World Senior Curling Championships in 2007.

In 2013, Hackner announced he would be playing in his final provincial championship, literally saying he was "too old for this shite". However that was a short lived retirement. He lost the men's provincial final to Brad Jacobs in 2015.

Hackner skipped Northern Ontario to the 2017 Canadian Masters Curling Championships.

Hackner was part of the staff for the Team USA women's team from 2012-14, and rejoined to become the coach in 2017. He led the team to the 2018 Winter Olympics, where they finished eighth.

Following the 2022 Canadian Senior Curling Championships, Hackner announced he was retiring from competitive curling.

Personal life
Hackner is a retired transportation conductor with CN Rail. He is married and has one son.

References

External links
 

Canadian people of German descent
Curlers from Northern Ontario
Curlers from Alberta
Living people
Curlers from Thunder Bay
World curling champions
1954 births
Ojibwe people
Brier champions
First Nations sportspeople
Canadian curling coaches
Canadian male curlers